The 1948 Baylor Bears football team represented Baylor University in the Southwest Conference (SWC) during the 1948 college football season. In their second season under head coach Bob Woodruff, the Bears compiled a 6–3–2 record (3–2–1 against conference opponents), tied for third place in the conference, and outscored opponents by a combined total of 167 to 125. They played their home games at Municipal Stadium in Waco, Texas. Robert "Buddy" Tinsley and Bentley M. Jones were the team captains.

Schedule

References

Baylor
Baylor Bears football seasons
Baylor Bears football